HSwMS Göta Lejon was a Swedish cruiser. Together with her sister ship , they were the largest ships ever to serve in the Royal Swedish Navy. In 1971 Göta Lejon was sold to Chile where she was renamed Almirante Latorre and served in the Chilean Navy until 1984. She was sold to Taiwan in 1986 to be scrapped.

References

External links 
 Göta Lejons sista resa (Göta Lejon's last voyage) Militærhistoria.se. 

Tre Kronor-class cruisers
Ships built in Gothenburg
1945 ships
Tre Kronor-class cruisers of the Chilean Navy